"I Just Don't Know What to Do with Myself" is a song written by Burt Bacharach and lyricist Hal David.

Composition
The song's life began in 1962, when Bacharach and David were songwriters at New York songwriting factory the Brill Building.

Original version
"I Just Don't Know What to Do With Myself" was first recorded by Chuck Jackson in 1962. This version was shelved and remained unreleased until it appeared on a 1984 compilation on the Kent record label called Mr. Emotion. According to the sleeve notes of that album, Jackson's vocals were substituted for Tommy Hunt's while the original backing track was retained.

The song was then recorded, also in 1962, by Tommy Hunt in a session produced by Jerry Leiber and Mike Stoller, with Burt Bacharach arranging and conducting. It was released as single Scepter 1236 (B-side "And I Never Knew") in May 1962, but did not chart. The song served as the title track for Hunt's sole album release on Scepter released in April 1963. 
The success in the UK of the Dusty Springfield version of "I Just Don't Know..." in the summer of 1964 led to Scepter's re-releasing the original, at which time it reached the Bubbling Under Hot 100 Singles chart in Billboard with a number 119 peak.

Dusty Springfield version
Dusty Springfield recorded "I Just Don't Know What to Do with Myself" in a session at Olympic Studios in Barnes, London with production credited to Philips Records owner Johnny Franz - although Springfield later stated her solo Philips tracks were self-produced - and arranged by Ivor Raymonde who conducted his orchestra; personnel on the session included Big Jim Sullivan on guitar and Bobby Graham on drums. Springfield, whose first solo recordings had included covers of the Bacharach/David compositions "Anyone Who Had a Heart" and "Wishin' and Hopin' " - had brought back "I Just Don't Know..." from an overnight trip to New York City where she met up with Bacharach in February 1964.

The third UK single release of Springfield's solo career - following the "Brill Building" Sound-alikes "I Only Want to Be With You" and "Stay Awhile" - "I Just Don't Know What to Do with Myself" was Springfield's first UK single release to display her signature vocal style; rising to number 3 in the summer of 1964 the track remained Springfield's highest UK Singles Chart hit, until she reached number 1 in 1966 with "You Don't Have to Say You Love Me", which was Springfield's only UK solo hit to chart higher than "I Just Don't Know...".

A concurrent US release of Springfield's "I Just Don't Know What to Do with Myself" was preempted by the presence of Springfield's "Wishin' and Hopin'" in the US Top Ten over the summer of 1964. Springfield's "I Just Don't Know..." received a belated US release in October 1965 featured on a single with Springfield's current UK hit "Some of Your Lovin'"; that month Springfield made a promotional junket to the US which included performances of both of the single's tracks on the TV shows Hullabaloo and Shindig but neither side reached the Billboard Hot 100.

Charts

Dionne Warwick version

Dionne Warwick recorded "I Just Don't Know What to Do with Myself" at Bell Sound Studios in August 1966 with Burt Bacharach producing; released that September the track is from her third album, Here Where There Is Love on Scepter Records. The song was a moderate success reaching number 26 on the US Hot 100 and number 20 on US Hot R&B with its strongest evident regional success in Detroit going Top Ten there.

After "Message to Michael" and "Trains and Boats and Planes" Warwick's "I Just Don't Know..." was her third consecutive single release comprising a previously recorded Bacharach/David song and Warwick's next Top 40 single "Alfie" would also fit in this category; three of the four appeared on Warwick's 1967 album Here Where There Is Love.

Track listing
US 7" Vinyl Single
A: "I Just Don't Know What to Do with Myself" – 2:50
B: "In Between the Heartaches" – 2:50

Notes
"In Between the Heartaches" - Published By – Blue Seas Music, Inc. / JAC Music Co., Inc. (ASCAP)"I Just Don't Know What to Do with Myself" - Published By – Quartet Music Inc. (BMI) Belinda (Canada Litd.)

Charts

Marcia Hines version

Marcia Hines recorded a version of the track and released it as the lead single from her second studio album, Shining (1976). The B-side was "Trilogy" was included on her debut studio album, Marcia Shines (1975).

Track listing
7-inch Single (ZS-153)
Side A "I Just Don't Know What to Do with Myself" (Burt Bacharach/Hal David) - 3:08
Side B "Trilogy" (Robie Porter) - 4:20

Weekly charts

Year-end charts

See also
 List of Top 25 singles for 1976 in Australia

The White Stripes version

In September 2003, "I Just Don't Know What to Do with Myself" was released as a single by American alternative rock band the White Stripes. It was the second single released from their album Elephant, reaching the top 40 in New Zealand, the United Kingdom, and on the US Billboard Modern Rock Tracks chart.

The black-and-white music video, directed by Sofia Coppola, cinematographed by Lance Acord and choreographed by Robin Conrad, features Kate Moss pole dancing in black underwear.

Track listings
UK CD single
 "I Just Don't Know What to Do with Myself"
 "Who's to Say..."
 "I'm Finding It Harder to Be a Gentleman" (live on the John Peel Show)

UK 7-inch single
A. "I Just Don't Know What to Do with Myself"
B. "Who's to Say..."

UK DVD single
 "I Just Don't Know What to Do with Myself" (audio)
 "Lafayette Blues" (audio)
 "Black Math" (filmed at the Masonic Temple, Detroit)

Charts

Release history

Other versions

 1964: A French version of the song by Michèle Vendôme and Claude Carrère, "Oui, il faut croire", was released by yéyé-singer Sheila.
 1967: A band from Gadsden, Alabama The BLEUS, recorded a version of the song at Muscle Shoals Studio, with Eddie Hinton producing, released on the AMY label. The recording met with great success in the southeast U.S.
 1968: An Italian translation by Franco Migliacci, "Se mi vuoi bene", was recorded by Patty Pravo. 
 1969: Cissy Houston recorded a pop/soul version for her album, Presenting Cissy Houston.
 1970: In October 1970 a Richard Perry-produced version of the song was released as the first solo single by Gary Puckett; primarily supported by Easy Listening radio, the track reached number 61 on the Hot 100 in Billboard magazine whose Easy Listening chart afforded Puckett's "I Just Don't Know..." a number 14 peak. 
 1970: Isaac Hayes released his version in the same year.
 1971: Tim Maia released his version on the B-side of his record Tim Maia.
 1972: The Dells.
 1978: Elvis Costello & The Attractions; Demis Roussos. Costello later wrote of his version, "It was a measure of how backwards things were in 1977 that some people actually thought I was making a joke when The Attractions and I began performing "I Just Don't Know What to Do with Myself". I was not being ironic. I was being extremely literal."
 1980: The Photos (featuring Wendy Wu).
 1991: The Stylistics.
 1994: Linda Ronstadt on Winter Light. 
 1996: Elvis Costello and Steve Nieve on Costello & Nieve limited edition live album. 
 1997: The soundtrack to My Best Friend's Wedding included a version by Nicky Holland. In the film, Cameron Diaz sings the song in a karaoke scene.
 2003: Steve Tyrell.
 2003: The White Stripes recorded the song for the album Elephant. It was also released as a single backed with "What to Say..." and "I'm Finding It Harder To Be A Gentleman (live)"
 2006: The song was performed and included in the soundtrack for Shout! The Mod Musical.
 2007: Trijntje Oosterhuis; Tina Arena.
 2009: Scottish pop singer and songwriter Jimmy Somerville recorded the song for his album, Suddenly Last Summer.
 2010: The White Stripes recorded the song live and released it on the album Under Great White Northern Lights
 2011: Ronan Keating recorded the song for his album, When Ronan Met Burt.
 2012: Melanie C recorded the song for her musical-theatre-inspired album, Stages.
2016 Mari Wilson recorded the song on her album Pop Deluxe 
2021 Colin Hay recorded the song and named his 2021 covers album after it.

Although the recording year is unknown, a 2002 release of Smokey Robinson and the Miracles' Away We a Go-Go includes their version of "I Just Don't Know What to Do with Myself".

Bibliography
 Serene Dominic. Burt Bacharach, Song by Song: The Ultimate Burt Bacharach Reference for Fans. Schirmer Trade, New York 2003.

References

External links
 White Stripes.net

Songs about depression
1962 songs
1964 singles
1966 singles
1976 singles
1978 singles
2003 singles
Dionne Warwick songs
Dusty Springfield songs
Marcia Hines songs
Cissy Houston songs
Elvis Costello songs
The White Stripes songs
Demis Roussos songs
Songs with lyrics by Hal David
Songs with music by Burt Bacharach
Song recordings produced by Johnny Franz
Song recordings with Wall of Sound arrangements
XL Recordings singles
Philips Records singles
Wizard Records singles
Scepter Records singles
V2 Records singles